Mirriah is a town and urban commune in Niger.

References

Communes of Niger